The Khoshut (Mongolian: Хошууд,, qoşūd, ; literally "bannermen," from Middle Mongolian qosighu "flag, banner") are one of the four major tribes of the Oirat people.

History 
Originally, Khoshuuds were one of the Khorchin tribes in southeastern Mongolia, but in the mid-15th century they migrated to western Mongolia to become an ally of the Oirats to counter central Mongolian military power. Their ruling family Galwas was the Hasarid-Khorchins who were deported by the Western Mongols.

The Khoshuts first appeared in the 1580s and by the 1620s were the most powerful Oirat tribe. They led others in converting to Buddhism. In 1636 Güshi Khan led many Khoshuds to occupy Kokenuur (Qinghai), and he was enthroned as king of Tibet by the 5th Dalai Lama. The Khoshut Khanate was established in 1642. Some time after 1645, his brother Kondeleng Ubashi migrated to the Volga, joining the Kalmyks. However, many Khoshuts remained in the Oirat homeland Dzungaria under Ochirtu Setsen.

After the Dzungar leader Galdan Boshogtu Khan killed Ochirtu, the Khoshut chief Khoroli submitted to the Qing dynasty with his people in 1686 and resettled in Alashan. 

The Khoshuts of the Dzungar Khanate remained influential until the Qing annihilated them in 1755. In 1771 the Volga Khoshuts fled back to Dzungaria with the Kalmyks and were resettled by the Qing around Bosten Lake. Their small remnants under a Tumen family in Kalmykia were influential until 1917. Another part of them was formed into a separate banner in Bulgan Province, Khovd Province; but they were counted as Torghut who migrated with them in much larger numbers.

20th Century 
Khoshuts in Alashan numbered 36,900 in 1990.

Khoshuts around Boston Lake numbered more than 12,000 in 1999.

See also
Lha-bzang Khan, Khoshut chief and King of Tibet
Upper Mongols

References
 Санчиров В. П. О Происхождении этнонима торгут и народа, носившего это название // Монголо-бурятские этнонимы: cб. ст. — Улан-Удэ: БНЦ СО РАН, 1996. C. 31—50. - in Russian
 Ovtchinnikova O., Druzina E., Galushkin S., Spitsyn V., Ovtchinnikov I. An Azian-specific 9-bp deletion in region V of mitochondrial DNA is found in Europe // Medizinische Genetic. 9 Tahrestagung der Gesellschaft für Humangenetik, 1997, p. 85.
 
 Galushkin S.K., Spitsyn V.A., Crawford M.H. Genetic Structure of Mongolic-speaking Kalmyks // Human Biology, December 2001, v.73, no. 6, pp. 823–834.
 Хойт С.К. Генетическая структура европейских ойратских групп по локусам ABO, RH, HP, TF, GC, ACP1, PGM1, ESD, GLO1, SOD-A // Проблемы этнической истории и культуры тюрко-монгольских народов. Сборник научных трудов. Вып. I. Элиста: КИГИ РАН, 2009. с. 146-183. - in Russian
 [hamagmongol.narod.ru/library/khoyt_2008_r.htm Хойт С.К. Антропологические характеристики калмыков по данным исследователей XVIII-XIX вв. // Вестник Прикаспия: археология, история, этнография. No. 1. Элиста: Изд-во КГУ, 2008. с. 220-243.]
 Хойт С.К. Кереиты в этногенезе народов Евразии: историография проблемы. Элиста: Изд-во КГУ, 2008. – 82 с.  (Khoyt S.K. Kereits in enthnogenesis of peoples of Eurasia: historiography of the problem. Elista: Kalmyk State University Press, 2008. – 82 p. (in Russian))
 [hamagmongol.narod.ru/library/khoyt_2012_r.htm Хойт С.К. Калмыки в работах антропологов первой половины XX вв. // Вестник Прикаспия: археология, история, этнография. No. 3, 2012. с. 215-245.]
 Boris Malyarchuk, Miroslava Derenko, Galina Denisova, Sanj Khoyt, Marcin Wozniak, Tomasz Grzybowski and Ilya Zakharov Y-chromosome diversity in the Kalmyks at theethnical and tribal levels // Journal of Human Genetics (2013), 1–8.
 Хойт С.К. Этническая история ойратских групп. Элиста, 2015. 199 с. (Khoyt S.K. Ethnic history of oyirad groups. Elista, 2015. 199 p. in Russian)
 video about khoshuuds
 Хойт С.К. Данные фольклора для изучения путей этногенеза ойратских групп // Международная научная конференция «Сетевое востоковедение: образование, наука, культура», 7-10 декабря 2017 г.: материалы. Элиста: Изд-во Калм. ун-та, 2017. с. 286-289. (in Russian)

Mongols
Oirats
Mongol peoples